A fish doorbell (Dutch: visdeurbel) is a system that allows fish to pass through a closed sluice gate through crowdsourced input when fish are present. The Utrecht Visdeurbel uses a livestreamed underwater camera that allows users to press a doorbell button to notify the lock operator that there are fish swimming in the gracht, and that the lock should be opened. It is designed to aid in seasonal fish migration, as an alternative to a physical fish ladder.

Usage 
It was deployed for the first time in Utrecht in March 2021, at the Weerdsluis on the Oudegracht. In the first two weeks, it was used 23,000 times. It was disabled in June, but has since been reinstated at visdeurbel.nl.

References

External links 
 Visdeurbel

Ecological connectivity